James John Krulicki (born March 9, 1948) is a Canadian retired ice hockey right winger. He played 41 games in the National Hockey League for the New York Rangers and the Detroit Red Wings during the 1970–71 season.

Professional career

Minor league hockey
Krulicki grew up playing for his hometown Kitchener Greenshirts and Kitchener Rangers of the Ontario Hockey Association, while a prospect of the New York Rangers. Krulicki recorded back-to-back 20 goal seasons in 1966–67 and 1967–68, scoring 25 and 28 goals respectively, for a total of 108 points over those two seasons. In 1968 he turned professional with the  Omaha Knights of the Central Hockey League. In his first season with the Knights he scored nine points, but followed that up in 1969–70 with a 28 point campaign. He helped the Knights reach first place in the regular season and win the Adams Cup as league champions of the playoffs. After scoring 12 points in the 12 game playoff run, Krulicki was called up to the Buffalo Bisons of the American Hockey League for their playoff run. He scored another five points as the Bisons reached the finals and won the Calder Cup after defeating the Springfield Kings four games to zero. Krulicki had just helped win championships for two different teams and had finally earned his chance at the NHL.

NHL career
Krulicki started the 1970–71 season with the New York Rangers. He recorded 2 assists in 27 games for the Rangers before being traded to the Detroit Red Wings on March 2, 1971, for Dale Rolfe. Krulicki finished the season with Detroit scoring one assist. He opted to retire at the conclusion of the 1970–71 season. He came back to play one final season with Wiener EV in the Austrian Hockey League during the 1972–73 season.

Career statistics

Regular season and playoffs

Awards
Adams Cup Champion: 1969–70 (Omaha Knights – CHL)
Calder Cup Champion: 1969–70 (Buffalo Bisons – AHL)

External links
 

1948 births
Living people
Buffalo Bisons (AHL) players
Canadian ice hockey right wingers
Detroit Red Wings players
Ice hockey people from Ontario
Kitchener Rangers players
New York Rangers players
Sportspeople from Kitchener, Ontario